Brisbane School District is a school district in California.  It consists of Lipman Middle School, Brisbane Elementary School, and Panorama Elementary School.

References

External links
 Official Brisbane School District web site 
 City of Brisbane, California
 City of Daly City, California

School districts in San Mateo County, California